The British Indian passport was a passport, proof of national status and travel document issued to British subjects of the British India (officially mentioned as Indian Empire), British subjects from other parts of the British Empire, and the subjects of the British protected states in the Indian subcontinent (i. e. the British Protected Persons of the 'princely states'). The title of the state stamped on the outside cover but not inside the passport was the "Indian Empire", which covered all of India, Pakistan, Bangladesh, and Myanmar (Burma).

The use of the passport was discontinued after the independence of India and Pakistan in 1947, and its bearers were entitled to opt for Indian, Pakistani or British nationality.

History

The use of passports was introduced to the British Raj after the First World War. 

The Indian Passport Act of 1920 required the use of passports, established controls on the foreign travel of Indians, and foreigners travelling to and within the Presidencies and Provinces of British India. The passport was based on the format agreed upon by the 1920 League of Nations International Conference on Passports.

However, the British Indian passport had very limited usage, being valid for travel only within areas governed by the British Empire, Italian Empire, Switzerland, Austria, Czechoslovakia, Germany, Spain, Norway, Sweden and Dutch Empire.

Issuance

A British Indian passport could be issued to persons who were British subjects by birth, naturalisation, a British protected person or the spouse or widow of such persons. The passports were issued by the passport offices run by provincial governments and were valid for five years after issue. In 1922, applicants were charged INR 1 to receive a new passport. The price was raised to INR 3 by 1933.

Physical appearance

The cover of passport was of navy blue colour with the emblem of the British Empire (i.e. the Royal Arms of the United Kingdom) emblazoned on the front cover. The word "British Indian Passport" was printed above the emblem and "Indian Empire" printed below. The text of the passport was printed in English and French. Other details were hand-written.

Bearer details

The passport includes the following details describing the bearer:

Passport number
Name of bearer
Place of issue
Date of issue
Accompanied by [wife, children]
National status - British subject by [birth or naturalisation]
Profession
Place and date of birth
Domicile
Height
Eye colour
Hair colour
Distinguishing features
Validity and expiry dates

The passports also included the photographs of the bearer and accompanying spouse. Latter half of the passport book was allocated for the visa and port of entry and departure stamps.

Passport note

The passport contains a note from the Governor General that is addressed to the authorities of all other states, identifying the bearer as a citizen of that state and requesting that he or she be allowed to pass and be treated according to international norms. The note inside of Indian Passports states:

These are to request and require in the name of the Viceroy and Governor-General of India all those whom it may concern to allow the bearer to pass freely without let or hindrance, and to afford him every assistance and protection of which he or she may stand in need.By the order of the Viceroy and Governor-General of India.''

The note bearing page is stamped and signed by the issuing passport officer with the provincial government of the place of issue.

See also

British passport
Indian passport
Pakistani passport
British nationality law
Indian nationality law
Pakistani nationality law
Bangladeshi passport
Bangladeshi nationality law

References

External links

Text of the Indian Passport Act 1920
A 1927 Indian passport - images from Passportland.com
British India - Folded Large Passport (1920) - Description and images of India's earliest passport.
Indian Empire : British Indian Passport (1931) British Indian Passport issued in 1931

Government of British India
Defunct passports